Mandrake of Oxford is a specialist independent publisher based in Oxford, England, primarily known for the publication of "hands-on" books for occult practitioners. The company was started in 1986 under the name Golden Dawn Publications, but changed its name to Mandrake upon the publication of Sexual Magick by Katon Shual (a pen-name of founder Mogg Morgan) in 1988. Mandrake publishes texts on magick, occulture, tantra and Thelema.

In 1992 Mandrake published Aleister Crowley's The Equinox, Volume I, Number 1 to 10.

Founder
Mandrake's founder, Mogg Morgan, when interviewed by occultebooks, said that he chose the name in 1987 as an homage to Aleister Crowley (see Mandrake Press) and that he prefers to publish new writers who are continuing to develop the Thelemic tradition.

Publications
Mandrake of Oxford is best known for discovering German occultist freestyle shaman Jan Fries, and publishing several of his works, including his seminal work, Visual Magick. The company also published for five issues an annual peer-reviewed Journal for the Academic Study of Magic. Other notable publications include:

 .  Note that Katon Shual is the pen name of Mogg Morgan.
 
 
 
 
 
 
 , 2003:

Periodicals
Mandrake's periodicals include:

 Nuit-Isis 
 Thelemic Magick (Volumes 1 & 2)

See also

 Esotericism in Germany and Austria
 Hermetic Qabalah
 Hermeticism
 Sex magic

Footnotes

References
Evans, Dave (2007). The History of British Magic After Crowley: Kenneth Grant, Amado Crowley, Chaos Magic, Lovecraft, the Left Hand Path, Blasphemy and Magical Morality.  Hidden Publishing.

External links

Book publishing companies of the United Kingdom
Book publishing company imprints
Small press publishing companies
Publishing companies established in 1986
1986 establishments in England
Thelema
Occult texts